Wenyingzhuangia gracilariae is a Gram-negative, strictly aerobic, rod-shaped and non-motile bacterium from the genus of Wenyingzhuangia which has been isolated from the alga Gracilaria vermiculophylla from the beach of Sodegaura.

References

Flavobacteria
Bacteria described in 2015